Jean Brankart (12 July 1930 – 23 July 2020) was a Belgian professional road bicycle racer who was active from 1953 to 1960. In 1955, Brankart finished the 1955 Tour de France in second place, winning two stages.

Major results

1953
Hannut
Houdeng
1954
Gembloux
Huy
Waremme
Tour de France:
9th place overall classification
1955
Herve
Charleroi
Tour de France:
2nd place overall classification
winner stages 18 and 21
1956
 national track pursuit champion
Alken
Libramont
Giro d'Italia:
7th place overall classification
1957
Herve
La Hulpe
1958
 national track pursuit champion
Hoegaarden
Namur
Giro d'Italia:
2nd place overall classification
 Winner mountains classification
1959
Grand Prix du Midi Libre
 national track pursuit champion
Seraing
Florenville
Hamme
Tour de France:
10th place overall classification

References

External links 

Belgian male cyclists
1930 births
2020 deaths
Belgian Tour de France stage winners
Tour de Suisse stage winners
Cyclists from Liège Province
People from Remicourt, Belgium